Molly Larkey (born December 31, 1971) is an American artist.

Larkey, the daughter of American singer-songwriter Carole King and bass player Charles Larkey, was educated at Columbia University and Rutgers University. She is a sculptor working with a variety of materials whose work references formalism and abstraction combined with symbolic imagery and bright colours. 

She is concerned with the way in which art functions as a means of communication. She has made pencil copies of drawings and manuscript pages of famous writers who have committed suicide.

She has had a solo exhibition at P.S.1 in 2007. She is based in Brooklyn, New York.

Selected exhibitions

2000
 Rutgers University, New Brunswick, New Jersey

2001
 An Exhibition of Works by Contemporary Women Artists, Bobbie Greenfield Gallery, Santa Monica

2004
 Black Milk, Marvelli Gallery, New York

2005
 LineAge, The Drawing Center, New York
 Off My Biscuit, Destroy Your District!, Samson Projects, Boston

2007
 Project Room, PS1 Contemporary Arts Center, Long Island City
 M*A*S*H, Smith-Stewart, New York
 I Died For Beauty, Newman Popiashvilli Gallery, New York
 Da Damage, Jack the Pelican Presents, Brooklyn

References

External links
 Official website
 Molly Larkey information from the Saatchi Gallery
 Information from ArtistsSpace.org

1971 births
Living people
20th-century American sculptors
20th-century American women artists
21st-century American sculptors
21st-century American women artists
21st-century American Jews
Columbia University alumni
Rutgers University alumni
American women sculptors
Jewish American artists
Jewish sculptors